The 2005 CFL Draft took place on Thursday, April 28, 2005 at 11:30 AM ET. 53 players were chosen from among eligible players from Canadian Universities across the country, as well as Canadian players playing in the NCAA. Of the 53 draft selections, 33 players were drafted from Canadian Interuniversity Sport institutions.

Forfeitures
 Toronto forfeited their third round selection after selecting Riall Johnson in the 2004 Supplemental Draft.

Round one

Round two

Round three

Round Four

Round Five

Round Six

References

Canadian College Draft
Cfl Draft, 2005